The 1997 World Women's Handball Championship took place in Germany 30 November – 14 December 1997. It was the first tournament with 24 teams. Denmark won its first title. Denmark's only defeat in the championship was by Macedonia.

Host Cities
The matches were held in the cities of Berlin, Hanover, Saarbrücken, Hamburg, Sindelfingen, Neubrandenburg and Rotenburg an der Fulda. The semi-finals and finals were held in the Berlin in the Max-Schmeling-Halle.

Squads

Group stage

Group A

Group B

Group C

Group D

Final round

Round of 16

Quarterfinals

Semifinals 

For places 1-4
 
 

For places 5-8

Finals

Final standings

World champions
 Lene Rantala
 Anne Dorthe Tanderup 
 Helle Simonsen
 Camilla Andersen 
 Tina Bottzau
 Anette Hoffman 
 Lone Mathiesen
 Janne Kolling 
 Merete Moller
 Anja Andersen 
 Gitte Sunesen
 Gitte Madsen 
 Tonje Kjaergaard
 Susanne Munk Lauritsen 
 Maybrit Nielsen
 Karina Jespersen 

Trainer: Ulrik Wilbek

Top goalscorers

All Star Team
 Goalkeeper: Susanne Munk Wilbek 
 Left Wing: Han Sun-hee 
 Left Back: Franziska Heinz 
 Center Back: Camilla Andersen 
 Pivot: Natalia Deriougina 
 Right Back: Tonje Sagstuen 
 Right Wing: Natalia Malakhova

References
Source: International Handball Federation

World Handball Championship tournaments
World Women's Handball Championship, 1997
W
Women's handball in Germany
World Women's Handball Championship
November 1997 sports events in Europe
December 1997 sports events in Europe